WHBC may refer to:

 WHBC (AM), a radio station (1480 AM) licensed to Canton, Ohio, United States
 WHBC-FM, a radio station (94.1 FM) licensed to Canton, Ohio, United States